The 2021 Novak Djokovic tennis season saw him become the second man in tennis history to achieve the Surface Slam (winning majors on the three different surfaces of clay, grass and hard court in the same calendar year) following Rafael Nadal in 2010, and repeat his feat from 2015 of reaching all four major finals in a season. He won five tournaments, three of them majors: the Australian Open, the French Open, and the Wimbledon Championships. Djokovic reached the final of the US Open in an attempt to achieve the Grand Slam, but finished runner-up to Daniil Medvedev. He also won the Paris Masters and Belgrade Open, and reached his first final in a doubles tournament since 2010 at the Mallorca Open.

During this season, Djokovic:
 Surpassed Roger Federer's record number of 310 weeks spent with the ATP No. 1 singles ranking to 353.
 Surpassed Pete Sampras' record of 6 year-end No. 1 ranking finishes to 7.
 Surpassed his record (joint with Nadal) of 36 Masters 1000 titles to 37.
 Surpassed Federer's record of 224 wins over top 10 players to 229.
 Surpassed Federer's record of 24 grand slam 1st place seedings to 28.
 Tied Federer and Nadal's all-time record total of 20 men's singles major titles.
 Tied Federer's all-time record of 31 major finals reached.

Yearly summary

Early hard court season

Djokovic was scheduled to appear in an Adelaide exhibition tournament, called "A Day at the Drive". He was supposed to play a match against Jannik Sinner. But, due to hand blisters, he chose to skip the match and prepare for the upcoming ATP Cup and the Australian Open. Fellow Serbian Filip Krajinović played and won the first set of the match by 6-3, but Djokovic made a surprise appearance to play the second set. Djokovic won the second set by 6-3, winning the match.

ATP Cup

Novak Djokovic began his official season by taking part in Serbia's national team in the ATP Cup. Looking to defend the past year's title, Serbia met Canada and Germany in Group A. Djokovic defeated Denis Shapovalov in straight sets, and teamed with Filip Krajinović to defeat Shapovalov and Milos Raonic in doubles, to help Serbia defeat Canada. However, Serbia's tournament ended with a loss against Germany. Djokovic defeated Alexander Zverev in three sets, but lost in doubles with Nikola Ćaćić against Zverev and Jan-Lennard Struff.

Australian Open

Djokovic started the Australian open with a straight sets win against Jeremy Chardy and a four-set win against Frances Tiafoe. Djokovic won a five-set thriller against Taylor Fritz in the third round, despite an injury scare. He continued his dominance at the Australian Open by overwhelming Milos Raonic and Zverev in four sets. He defeated Russians Aslan Karatsev and Daniil Medvedev in straight sets in the semi-finals and finals, to win the Australian Open again. The victory marked his record-extending ninth men's singles title at the tournament, and also his 18th major title overall.

Miami Open
Djokovic withdrew from the 2021 Miami Open, citing a desire to rest after the Australian Open and spend more time with family. He also wanted to prepare for the upcoming clay court season.

Spring clay court season

Monte-Carlo Masters

After a straight sets win over Sinner, Djokovic was upset by Dan Evans in the third round, marking his first singles loss of the season.

Serbia Open

After straight-sets wins over Kwon Soon-woo and compatriot Miomir Kecmanovic, Djokovic lost in the semifinals to Karatsev in three tight sets.

Italian Open

Djokovic started the defense of his Italian Open title with straight sets wins over Fritz and Alejandro Davidovich Fokina. After this, he had an early scare, down a set and a break in a rainy match against Stefanos Tsitsipas that was postponed. The next day, he made a comeback and won. The same day, he also won his semifinal against Lorenzo Sonego in three sets. Djokovic then lost to Rafael Nadal in the final in three sets.

Serbia Open Part 2

Djokovic started the Serbia Open part 2 with straight sets wins over Mats Moraing and Federico Coria. After reaching the final with a three set win over Andrej Martin, Djokovic won his 83rd title, at home, defeating Alex Molčan in straight sets.

French Open

Djokovic began with straight set wins against Tennys Sandgren, Pablo Cuevas, and Ricardas Berankis in the first three rounds. In the fourth round, Lorenzo Musetti led by two sets to love, but Djokovic then won all but one game afterwards; Musetti retired in the fifth set. After a four set win in the quarterfinals against Matteo Berrettini, Djokovic shockingly defeated Nadal in the semifinals in four brutal sets, only the second time he had beaten Nadal at Roland Garros, and only the third time Nadal lost at the event. Djokovic then defeated Stefanos Tsitsipas in the final in five sets, after losing the first two. It was his 19th major title, and he completed a double Career Grand Slam. He became the first player in the Open Era to win a Major after coming back from a two-set deficit in two separate matches in the same tournament (in the fourth round and the final). He also became the first player to beat Nadal on the way to winning Roland Garros.

Grass court season

Mallorca Open

Djokovic's grass-court season began at the Mallorca Championships, where he competed in doubles alongside Carlos Gómez-Herrera. The team advanced to the final, but they withdrew before the match due to an injury to Gómez-Herrera.

Wimbledon

Djokovic entered Wimbledon as the defending champion from 2019 and the favorite for the title. He won a four-set first round over British wildcard Jack Draper. He reached the final with five straight set wins, defeating Denis Kudla, former runner-up Kevin Anderson, Marton Fucsovics, Chilean seed Cristian Garin, and Denis Shapovalov. He then recovered from a one-set deficit in the final against Matteo Berrettini to claim his sixth Wimbledon title and 20th men's singles major title overall, equaling Roger Federer and Nadal's all-time record.

Late hard court season

Tokyo Olympics
 

Djokovic opened his summer hard court season at the Tokyo Olympics, where he sought to improve on his bronze medal result from Beijing 2008 and pursue a potential calendar-year and career Golden Slam. He won his first four rounds in straight sets, against Hugo Dellien Struff, Davidovich Fokina and hometown player Kei Nishikori, to reach the semifinals, where he lost to Alexander Zverev in 3 sets despite being a set and a break up. He then lost his bronze medal match to Pablo Carreño Busta in 3 tight sets. He also participated in the mixed doubles alongside Nina Stojanović, where the pair won their first two matches in straight sets but lost in the semifinals and withdrew from the bronze medal match. Djokovic thus left the Olympics without any medals.

US Open

Djokovic entered the tournament in contention for the Grand Slam, a feat in men's singles tennis achieved only by Don Budge in 1938 and Rod Laver in 1962 and 1969. Djokovic won in four sets against Holger Rune and against Tallon Griekspoor in straight sets. He then proceeded to lose the first set and win the subsequent three in each of his next three matches, against Nishikori, Jenson Brooksby, and Berrettini. He then defeated Zverev in five sets in the semifinals. Djokovic then lost in the final to Medvedev in straight sets, ending his Grand Slam bid.

European indoor hard court season

Paris Masters

Djokovic played in men's doubles, partnering Krajinovic. They won in the first round, but lost the next round in straight sets.
In singles, Djokovic defeated Marton Fucsovics in 3 sets, and advanced to the quarter finals after a walkover by Gael Monfils in the Round of 16. He won the semifinals against Hubert Hurkacz in three sets in the semifinals, securing the year-end No. 1 ranking for a record seventh time. In the final, he avenged his US Open final loss by beating Medvedev in three sets, winning a record-extending sixth Paris Masters title, and a record 37th Masters title overall.

ATP Finals

Djokovic won all of his round-robin matches (against Casper Ruud, Andrey Rublev, and Cameron Norrie) in straight sets to advance to the semifinals, but then lost a 3-setter to Alexander Zverev.

All matches
This table lists all the matches of Djokovic in 2021, including walkovers (W/O)

Singles matches

Doubles matches

Mixed Doubles matches

Exhibition matches

Singles

Schedule
Per Novak Djokovic, this is his current 2021 schedule (subject to change). The ATP rankings are currently affected by the COVID-19 pandemic; they are on a Best of 24-month basis through the week of 15 March 2021. Until then, all the events are non-mandatory and players can use the best result from the same event in that 24-month span.

Singles schedule

Doubles schedule

Yearly records

Head-to-head matchups
Novak Djokovic has a  ATP match win–loss record in the 2021 season. Bold indicates player was ranked top 10 at the time of at least one meeting. The following list is ordered by number of wins:

  Matteo Berrettini 3–0
  Taylor Fritz 3–0
  Alexander Zverev 3–2
  Daniil Medvedev 2–1
  Alejandro Davidovich Fokina 2–0
  Márton Fucsovics 2–0
  Kei Nishikori 2–0
  Denis Shapovalov 2–0
  Jan-Lennard Struff 2–0
  Stefanos Tsitsipas 2–0
  Aslan Karatsev 1–1
  Rafael Nadal 1–1
  Kevin Anderson 1–0
  Ričardas Berankis 1–0 
  Jenson Brooksby 1–0
  Alexander Bublik 1–0
  Jérémy Chardy 1–0
  Marin Čilić 1–0
  Federico Coria 1–0
  Pablo Cuevas 1–0
  Hugo Dellien 1–0
  Jack Draper 1–0
  Cristian Garín 1–0
  Tallon Griekspoor 1–0
  Hubert Hurkacz  1–0
  Miomir Kecmanović 1–0
  Denis Kudla 1–0
  Andrej Martin 1–0
  Alex Molčan 1–0
  Mats Moraing 1–0
  Lorenzo Musetti 1–0
  Cameron Norrie 1–0
  Dennis Novak 1–0
  Milos Raonic 1–0
  Andrey Rublev 1–0
  Holger Rune 1–0
  Casper Ruud 1–0
  Tennys Sandgren 1–0
  Jannik Sinner 1–0
  Lorenzo Sonego 1–0
  Kwon Soon-woo 1–0
  Frances Tiafoe 1–0
  Pablo Carreño Busta 0–1
  Dan Evans 0–1

* Statistics correct .

Finals

Singles: 7 (5 titles, 2 runners-up)

Doubles: 1 (1 runner-up)

Earnings

Bold font denotes tournament win

 Figures in United States dollars (USD) unless noted. 
source：2021 Singles Activity
source：2021 Doubles Activity

See also
 2021 ATP Tour
 2021 Rafael Nadal tennis season
 2021 Daniil Medvedev tennis season

Notes

References

External links
  
 ATP tour profile

Novak Djokovic tennis seasons
Djokovic
2021 in Serbian sport